() is a studio album by Domician singer Angela Carrasco released in 1988. The album became a success on the Latin Pop Albums charts and produced two singles, one of which reached number-one on Hot Latin Tracks.

Track listing 
 Dama 
 Necesito Tu Olor
 Ola de Calor
 Lo Importante es Terminar
 Boca Rosa
 Lo Quiero a Morir
 No Quiero Nada de Ti
 Machos
 La Ley de la Selva
 Perfume de Aventura

Chart performance

References 

1988 albums
Angela Carrasco albums
EMI Records albums
Spanish-language albums